John Horsley Hose CBE (born 21 March 1928) is a former British trade union leader.

Hose grew up in Nottingham, and attended the Nottingham Bluecoat School.  In 1943, he became an architect's assistant, then from 1946 to 1948 undertook National Service with the Royal Engineers.  The following year, he became working for the Forestry Commission, and remained in this line of work for many years, also joining the National Union of Agricultural and Allied Workers (NUAAW).

In 1978, Hose was elected as President of the NUAAW, in which role he campaigned for a ban on the use of 2,4,5-T, a weedkiller which had been used as a component of Agent Orange.  In 1980, he was re-elected as President, defeating Joan Maynard.  By this time, the union was in financial difficulties and in 1982, with the backing of Maynard but the opposition of Hose, it merged into the Transport and General Workers' Union (TGWU).

Hose became chairman of the TGWU's new Agricultural and Allied Workers' National Trade Group, serving for four years, after which he served on the union's General Executive Council for two years.  In 1987, Hose was made a Commander of the Order of the British Empire, and he retired in 1989.

References

1928 births
Living people
Commanders of the Order of the British Empire
Presidents of the National Union of Agricultural and Allied Workers
People educated at Nottingham Bluecoat Academy
People from Nottingham